Shumka is a genus of true bugs belonging to the family Cicadellidae.

Species:
 Shumka irmgardae (Dworakowska, 1994) 
 Shumka versicolor Dworakowska, 1997 
 Shumka wareeae Dworakowska, 1997

References

Cicadellidae
Cicadellidae genera